Myoxanthus octomeriae is a species of orchid occurring from Mexico to Guyana.

References

External links 

 
 

octomeriae
Orchids of Guyana
Orchids of Mexico